The 2013 AFC Champions League was the 32nd edition of the top-level Asian club football tournament organized by the Asian Football Confederation (AFC), and the 11th under the current AFC Champions League title. The defending champions, Ulsan Hyundai, failed to qualify for the tournament.

In the final, Chinese team Guangzhou Evergrande defeated South Korean team FC Seoul on away goals to win their first title, becoming the first Chinese team to win the AFC Champions League (and the second Chinese team to be crowned Asian club champions after Liaoning FC and Third Final of Chinese team after lost of Liaoning F.C. agenst Esteghlal F.C. of Iran at 1990–91 AFC Club Championship, and qualified for the 2013 FIFA Club World Cup.

Allocation of entries per association
The AFC laid out the procedure for deciding the participating associations and the allocation of slots, with inspection of the associations interested in participating in the AFC Champions League to be done in 2012, and the final decision to be made by the AFC in November 2012.

The following criteria for participation in the AFC Champions League were proposed by the AFC in July 2012:
The member association (MA) has to acquire a minimum number of 600 points out of a possible 1000 according to the AFC evaluating system to qualify for participation.
The slots for each eligible MA are decided based on the points ranking of the MAs:
The top two ranked MAs in both the East and West zones get four direct slots each.
The third-ranked MAs get three direct and one play-off slot.
The fourth-ranked MAs get two direct and one play-off slot.
The fifth-ranked MAs get one direct and one play-off slot.
The sixth, seventh and eighth-ranked MAs get only a play-off slot each.
The maximum number of slots for each MA is one-third of the total number of clubs in the top division (e.g., Australia can only get a maximum of three total slots as there are only nine Australia-based clubs in the A-League).

On 29 November 2012, the AFC Executive Committee approved the slots for the 2013 edition of the AFC Champions League. However, this final allocation of slots did not fully follow the proposal above.

Notes

Teams
The following teams entered the competition.

In the following table, the number of appearances and last appearance count only those since the 2002–03 season (including qualifying rounds), when the competition was rebranded as the AFC Champions League.

Schedule
The schedule of the competition was as follows (all draws held at AFC headquarters in Kuala Lumpur, Malaysia).

Format changes
The following changes in the format of the competition were made compared with the previous year:
Losers of the AFC Champions League qualifying play-off did not participate in the AFC Cup.
The round of 16 was played over two legs on a home-and-away basis instead of as a single match.
The final was played over two legs on a home-and-away basis instead of as a single match.

Qualifying play-off

The draw for the qualifying play-off was held on 6 December 2012. Each tie was played as a single match, with extra time and penalty shoot-out used to decide the winner if necessary. The winners of each tie advanced to the group stage to join the 29 automatic qualifiers.

|-
!colspan=3|West Zone

|-
!colspan=3|East Zone

|}

Notes

Group stage

The draw for the group stage was held on 6 December 2012. The 32 teams were drawn into eight groups of four. Teams from the same association could not be drawn into the same group. Each group was played on a home-and-away round-robin basis. The winners and runners-up of each group advanced to the round of 16.

Tiebreakers
The teams are ranked according to points (3 points for a win, 1 point for a tie, 0 points for a loss). If tied on points, tiebreakers are applied in the following order:
Greater number of points obtained in the group matches between the teams concerned
Goal difference resulting from the group matches between the teams concerned
Greater number of goals scored in the group matches between the teams concerned (away goals do not apply)
Goal difference in all the group matches
Greater number of goals scored in all the group matches
Penalty shoot-out if only two teams are involved and they are both on the field of play
Fewer score calculated according to the number of yellow and red cards received in the group matches (1 point for a single yellow card, 3 points for a red card as a consequence of two yellow cards, 3 points for a direct red card, 4 points for a yellow card followed by a direct red card)
Drawing of lots

Group A

Group B

Tiebreakers
Al-Ettifaq are ranked ahead of Pakhtakor on head-to-head record.

Group C

Group D

Group E

Tiebreakers
Buriram United and Jiangsu Sainty are tied on head-to-head record, and so are ranked by overall goal difference.

Group F

Tiebreakers
Jeonbuk Hyundai Motors are ranked ahead of Urawa Red Diamonds on head-to-head record.

Group G

Group H

Knockout stage

In the knock-out stage, the 16 teams played a single-elimination tournament. Each tie was played on a home-and-away two-legged basis. The away goals rule, extra time (away goals do not apply in extra time) and penalty shoot-out were used to decide the winner if necessary.

Bracket

Round of 16
In the round of 16, the winners of one group played the runners-up of another group in the same zone, with the group winners hosting the second leg.

Quarter-finals
The draw for the quarter-finals, semi-finals, and final (to decide the order of two legs) was held on 20 June 2013. In this draw, teams from different zones could play each other, and the "country protection" rule was applied: if there are exactly two teams from the same association, they may not play each other in the quarter-finals; however, if there are more than two teams from the same association, they may play each other in the quarter-finals.

Semi-finals

Final

Awards

Top scorers

See also
2013 AFC Cup
2013 AFC President's Cup
2013 FIFA Club World Cup

References

External links

 
2013
1